SR10 or SR-10 may refer to:
 the Texas Instruments SR-10, a predecessor of the TI SR-50 pocket calculator;
 State Route 10, one of several highways numbered 10 worldwide;
 the SR-10, a variant of the Stinson Reliant, a monoplane from the 1930s;
 the KB SAT SR-10, a contemporary Russian jet trainer aircraft.